The Purple-leafed Jersey or Guernsey Elm Ulmus minor 'Purpurea' is largely  confined to Australia.

Accessions

Europe
Grange Farm Arboretum, Lincolnshire, UK. Acc. no. 1268.

Nurseries

Australasia
Established Tree Planters Pty.

Field elm cultivar
Ulmus articles missing images
Ulmus